Ona Narbutienė (October 26, 1930 in Kaunas  – July 10, 2007, in Vilnius) was a Lithuanian musicologist and educator. She received the Lithuanian National Prize for arts and culture in 1999, and was the author of a number of articles on Lithuanian music history and several books on Lithuanian composers and musical personalities.

Narbutienė was born into the family of Lithuanian officer and spent her childhood in Klaipėda. In  1949, she was arrested in Vilnius and deported to Siberia, Irkutsk Oblast, where she was forced to work in brick factory. After some time she could finish her education and started working as a musical teacher in Irkutsk school. After Joseph Stalin's death she was allowed to return to Lithuania. 1955-1960 she studied at Vilnius Conservatory and started researching music history.

Narbutienė organized the musical program of the Thomas Mann Festival in Nida from its inception in 1995 until 2007. The summer festival, under her sponsorship, was dedicated to topics such as Thomas Mann and Richard Wagner (1998), Thomas Mann and the myth (2000) and Thomas Mann and the North (2001). The programs combined concerts, readings, exhibitions, theatre performances, and film screenings. She described the festival's concept as revolving around the connections of Thomas Mann to music. She also contributed to the inclusion of song and dance celebrations in Estonia, Latvia and Lithuania in UNESCO's Masterpieces of the Oral and Intangible Heritage of Humanity.

References
Lithuanian musicologist/educator Ona Narbutiene Dies International Association of Music Information Centres, July x, 2007. Retrieved August 31, 2007
Ona Narbutienė, Lithuanian musicologist and educator, died on July 10th, aged 77 Music Export Lithuania, July 10, 2007. Retrieved August 31, 2007
On the occasion of the 5th anniversary of the inauguration of the Cultural Centre an anthology in Lithuanian is published Thomas Mann Cultural Centre. Retrieved August 31, 2007
Proclamation of Masterpieces of the Oral and Intangible Heritage of Humanity Retrieved August 31, 2007

Musicians from Kaunas
Recipients of the Lithuanian National Prize
1930 births
2007 deaths
Lithuanian musicologists
Women musicologists
Narbutiene
Lithuanian Academy of Music and Theatre alumni
Writers from Vilnius
20th-century musicologists
20th-century women musicians